Harriet Louisa Childe-Pemberton (1 April 1852 – 1922) was an English author of the late-nineteenth and early-twentieth centuries.

Biography 
Harriet Louisa Childe-Pemberton was born in 1852, in St Leonards-On-Sea, Sussex, and raised at Millichope Park, Munslow, Shropshire, the daughter of Charles Orlando Childe-Pemberton and Augusta Mary Shakespear Childe-Pemberton. In 1859, her father served as Sheriff of Shropshire. In 1870, she was presented to Queen Victoria. Her younger brother William Shakespear Childe-Pemberton (1859–1924) was also a writer, best known as a biographer.

Childe-Pemberton lived in London later in life, and wrote plays, poems, short stories, novels, and literary criticism. Her 1882 story "All My Doing; or, Red Riding-Hood Over Again" remains of interest to literary scholars, for its unique retelling of the classic Little Red Riding Hood tale. Several of her books were published by the Society for Promoting Christian Knowledge. She died in 1922.

Selected works

Poetry 

 Love Knows – and Waits, and Other Poems
 "A Gift" and "The Nightingale's Song", in A Crown of Flowers: poems and pictures collected from the Girl's Own Paper (1883)
 "Was It an Angel's Song?" in Peterson's Magazine (January 1883)
 "Bye and Bye" in Peterson's Magazine (March 1884)
"The Last Word", in Frank Leslie's Popular Monthly (April 1885)
 Nenuphar: The Four-Fold Flower of Life (poems, 1911)
In a Tuscan Villa And Other Poems

Plays and dramatic recitations 

Prince, A Story of the American War (1881)
The Tiger Tamed (a libretto, 1885)
Dead letters, and other narrative and dramatic pieces (1896)
A Backward Child (1899)
Nicknames: A Comedietta in One Act (c1900)
Twenty Minutes: Drawing Room Duologues (c1900)
Original Readings and Recitations

Fiction 

The Story of Stella Peel (1880)
Under the Trees (1881)
The Fairy Tales of Every Day (1882), includes "All My Doing; Or, Red Riding-Hood Over Again"
No Beauty (1884)
Birdie: A Tale of Child Life (1888)

References 

1852 births
1922 deaths
19th-century British short story writers
Writers from Shropshire
Victorian women writers
English dramatists and playwrights
English women poets
English short story writers
English literary critics
Women literary critics